The list of Romanian historical films groups historical drama film and TV productions by the Romanian cinema. Historical films are a genre in which stories are based upon historical events and famous persons. Some films attempt to accurately portray a historical event or biography, to the degree that the available historical research will allow, while others are fictionalized tales that are based on an actual person and their deeds.

The action in the majority of the films is set in the region of modern Romania.

See also 

 List of historical drama films
 List of war films and TV specials
 List of films set in ancient Rome
 List of costume drama films
 List of Romanian films
 List of Romanian submissions for the Academy Award for Best Foreign Language Film
 List of Romanian film and theatre directors
 Cinema of Romania
 Period piece
 Epic film
 Biographical film

External links 
 Romanian historical films at Cinemagia 

Romanian